Zarab or Zar Ab may refer to:
 Zarab, Ilam